The Sentinels are two 90 metre tall residential tower blocks on Holloway Head in Birmingham, England. The two towers, called Clydesdale Tower and Cleveland Tower, are both 31 storeys tall and were part of a major regeneration and council home building scheme following World War II which in the 1960s and 1970s saw the construction of hundreds of tower blocks. Originally built and operated by the City of Birmingham, the buildings were part of a stock transfer from Birmingham local authority to Optima Community Association in 1999, and today the buildings are owned by Citizen housing association (itself an amalgamation of several West Midlands housing associations). The Sentinels were the tallest purely residential tower blocks in the city until the completion of the 102 metre tall skyscraper Bank Tower 2 in 2019. They are also surpassed by the 132 metre tall residential tower known as The Mercian located on Broad Street with 42 floors.

History

Planning
The tower blocks were the brainchild of the Chairman of Birmingham's House Building and Housing
Management Committees returning from a visit to Chicago to witness the opening of the Marina City development which consists of two 61-storey towers. The councillors decided that Birmingham needed a development similar to this and in 1965, plans began to surface for the construction of twin towers at Holloway Head to overlook the new ring road.

After discussions over height, it was decided that the tower blocks should be 32 storeys tall, one storey taller than the Red Road tower blocks in Glasgow, Scotland. It was decided to construct them out of concrete, which was common among tower blocks in the city during that time. They were designed by C.Bryant & Son. and both towers were identical though angled differently to provide a different perspective to each block.

Construction
The project was approved in 1967 and construction of the towers commenced immediately. Cleveland Tower was completed in 1970 and Clydesdale Tower in 1971. Upon their opening, they had 488 flats.

Recent changes to housing legislation by the incoming Conservative government allowed the Council to offer many of the flats on a cost rent basis to those not on the council housing waiting list. The flats thus initially attracted a much wider range of tenants than would usually be found in a high rise council block, including the actress Noele Gordon (who appreciated their closeness to the ATV television studios) and many gay men who found it convenient for the nearby gay bars.

Although changes to the Council's letting policy subsequently ended cost rent lettings, the Sentinels have always enjoyed a wider range of residents than many other blocks and remain popular.

During the height of the HIV/AIDS crisis the number of gay men living in the Sentinels provoked hysteria in the media with the tabloid Daily Star, interviewing one new resident who said that she wore protective gloves when touching the buttons on the lift in fear of contracting the disease.

Refurbishment
In 1999, residents of The Sentinels together with four other council owned estates, voted to transfer their homes into the ownership of an independent housing association, Optima Community Association. Optima then embarked on an extensive refurbishment programme as part of a wider regeneration scheme in the Attwood Green area in Birmingham.

The project at The Sentinels involved replacing windows, kitchens, lifts, refurbishing the communal areas and improving security. A new entrance was constructed as well as a roof feature, lighting scheme, which illuminates the building a blue light at night, and the addition of new cladding to the exterior of the building.

In 2004, the Sentinels Residents Association submitted a petition to Birmingham City Council complaining about waste facilities. They also complained about a man, who had previously threatened suicide, being rehoused on a high floor of one of the towers.

See also
Beetham Tower, Birmingham
List of tallest buildings and structures in Birmingham

References

External links
Clydesdale Tower on Skyscrapernews
Cleveland Tower on Skyscrapernews
Optima Community Association

 

Buildings and structures in Birmingham, West Midlands
Residential buildings completed in 1971
Twin towers
Residential skyscrapers in England